Zerfaß is a German family name, derived from Servatius. 

Those with the surname include:
 Julius Zerfaß (1886–1956), German journalist
 Dan Zerfaß (born 1968), German organist

See also
 Zerfas (disambiguation)
 Surface (surname)

References

German-language surnames